Talia Balsam (born March 5, 1959) is an American television and film actress.

Early life
Balsam was born in New York City on March 5, 1959, to actors Martin Balsam and Joyce Van Patten. Her ancestry is Russian Jewish (father) and Italian, Dutch, and English (mother). She is the niece of actor Dick Van Patten, actress Pat Van Patten and actor and director Tim Van Patten. Her cousin is actress Grace Van Patten.

She attended a boarding school in Tucson, Arizona, in her adolescent years.

Career
Balsam began her career appearing in a recurring role on the ABC sitcom Happy Days and later appeared in a number of shows, including Dallas, Taxi, Hill Street Blues, Family Ties and Magnum, P.I.. Balsam also played leading roles in films Crawlspace (1986) and In the Mood (1987). She also appeared in a number of made-for-television movies, including Kent State (1981), Nadia (1984), and Consenting Adult (1985). Balsam continued playing supporting film roles and guest starred on television through 1990s and 2000s, include The Cake Eaters (2007), L.A. Doctors (1998–99) and Without a Trace (2003–04).

From 2007 to 2014, Balsam had a recurring role as Mona Sterling in the AMC period drama series Mad Men. In 2012, she also had a recurring role in the Showtime thriller Homeland as Cynthia Walden. From 2016 to 2019, she starred opposite Sarah Jessica Parker in the HBO comedy series, Divorce.

Personal life
Balsam married actor George Clooney in Las Vegas in 1989; they were divorced in 1993. In an interview with Vanity Fair after their divorce, Clooney stated, "I probably (definitely) wasn't someone who should have been married at that point. I just don't feel like I gave Talia a fair shot." Since 1998, Balsam has been married to John Slattery, with whom she has a son, Harry Slattery. They married in Kauai, Hawaii. They played husband and wife Roger and Mona Sterling in Mad Men. Balsam lives with her family in SoHo, Manhattan.

Filmography

Film

Television

References

External links
 

1959 births
Actresses from New York City
American film actresses
American stage actresses
American television actresses
Lee Strasberg Theatre and Film Institute alumni
Living people
People from SoHo, Manhattan
20th-century American actresses
21st-century American actresses
American people of Russian-Jewish descent
American people of English descent
American people of Dutch descent
American people of Italian descent
Van Patten family